Tademaït is a natural region in the Sahara Desert right in the centre of Algeria. It is located north of In Salah and south of the Grand Erg Occidental in the Adrar District of Adrar Province, El Ménia District of Ghardaïa Province and the northern end of Tamanrasset Province. It is one of the places of the Sahara Desert where the summer heat is most extreme.

Geography
The Tademaït is a rocky plateau made up of cretaceous terrain with a general slope towards the northeast. It is an extremely dry and hyper-arid area with a hot desert climate (Köppen climate classification BWh) as the region is virtually rainless throughout the year and it has long, extremely hot summers and short, very warm winters .

A meteorite was found in Tademaït in November 2002.

See also
Geography of Algeria
Tuat

References

External links
Tademait Plateau: A regional groundwater recharge area in the centre of the Algerian Sahara

Deserts of Algeria
Natural regions of Africa
Plateaus of Africa
Landforms of Algeria
Geography of Adrar Province
Geography of Ghardaïa Province
Geography of Tamanrasset Province